Fábio Marcelino (born 11 March 1973) is a Brazilian volleyball player. He competed in the men's tournament at the 1996 Summer Olympics.

References

1973 births
Living people
Brazilian men's volleyball players
Olympic volleyball players of Brazil
Volleyball players at the 1996 Summer Olympics
Sportspeople from São Paulo